Beci is a village in the Dushkaja subregion in the Gjakova Municipality of Kosovo. It is almost exclusively inhabited by ethnic Albanians, who form the near-absolute majority of the village's population.

Etymology
It is believed that the toponym is derived from the Albanian word Bec-i, which means "little lamb" in Albanian.

Geography
Beci is bordered by Sapot to the west, Zhdrellë and Rashkoc to the northwest and north, Cërmjan to the northeast, Meqe east , Doblibare and Vraniq to the southeast and with Lugu e Bunarit to the south and southwest. It is located in the ethnographic Dushkaja region, and is situated around 7km northeast of Gjakova.

History
Beci is divided into two sections - Beci i Epër (Upper Beci) and Beci i Poshtëm (Lower Beci). In the cadastral documents of the Sanjak of Shkodra in 1485, the village is mentioned with the name Beçi.

Anthropology 
Beci is inhabited by a near-absolute majority of ethnic Albanians, and most of the inhabitants traditionally belonged to a single Albanian tribal brotherhood around 300 years ago - the Mërturi-Berisha. The village was traditionally divided into 4 neighbourhoods - the neighbourhoods of the Biblekët, Ndreajt, Salcët and Tetajt. The Muslim and Catholic Albanians here belong to the same brotherhood. There is also a family that hails from the Krasniqi tribe and one that hails from the Thaçi tribe.

Notes

References

Villages in Gjakova